The Scalloped Sallow (Eucirroedia pampina) is a moth of the family Noctuidae. It is found from British Columbia to Nova Scotia, south to Florida, west to Arkansas and Wisconsin.

The wingspan is 36–44 mm. Adults are on wing from August to December, with peaks in September and October.

The larvae feed on the leaves of black cherry, choke cherry and maple.

Subspecies
Eucirroedia pampina pampina
Eucirroedia pampina glenwoodi (Colorado, ...)

External links
Bug Guide
Images

Cuculliinae
Moths of North America